Vizcaya was an  armored cruiser of the Spanish Navy that fought at the Battle of Santiago de Cuba during the Spanish–American War.

Technical characteristics

Vizcaya was built at Bilbao, Spain. She was laid down in 1889, launched on 8 July 1891, and completed in 1893. She had two funnels and was fast and well armed. Her main armament was mounted on the center line in single barbettes fore and aft.  Her armor was poor: her  guns had only lightly armored hoods, her  guns were mounted in the open on the upper deck, her armor belt was thin and protected only two-thirds of her length, and she had a high, unprotected freeboard that took much damage during the Battle of Santiago de Cuba. Like other nineteenth-century warships, she was heavily furnished and decorated with wood, which the Spanish failed to remove prior to combat and which would feed fires during the battle.

Operational history
Vizcaya was visiting New York City on a friendly visit to reciprocate for the visit of battleship  to Havana, Cuba, when Maine exploded and sank at Havana on 15 February 1898. Vizcaya then steamed to Havana, where she rendezvoused with her sister ship . Ordered back across the Atlantic as war approached, both ships was assigned to the Spanish Navy's 1st Squadron, which was concentrating at São Vicente in Portugal's Cape Verde Islands under Vice Admiral Pascual Cervera y Topete. They arrived at São Vicente on 19 April 1898. It was noted that Vizcaya badly needed drydocking because of a badly fouled bottom, her 5.5-inch guns had defective breech mechanisms and had been supplied with defective ammunition, and the fleet had a shortage of stokers.

The Spanish–American War began while Vizcaya was at São Vicente. Ordered by neutral Portugal in accordance with international law to leave São Vicente within 24 hours of the declaration of war, Vizcaya and the rest of Cervera's squadron departed on 29 April 1898, bound for San Juan, Puerto Rico. Cervera's ships reached French-owned Martinique in the Lesser Antilles on 10 May 1898. While Vizcaya and the other large ships loitered in international waters, two Spanish destroyers went into Fort-de-France to ask for coal. France was neutral and would not supply coal, so the Spanish squadron departed on 12 May 1898 for Dutch-owned Curaçao, where Cervera expected to meet a collier. Cervera arrived at Willemstad on 14 May, but the Netherlands also was neutral, and strictly enforced its neutrality by allowing only Vizcaya and her sister ship  to enter port and permitting them to load only 600 tons of coal. On 15 May, Cervera's ships departed, no longer bound for San Juan, which by now was under a U.S. Navy blockade, but for as-yet unblockaded Santiago de Cuba on the southeastern coast of Cuba, arriving there on 19 May 1898. Cervera hoped to refit his ships there before he could be trapped. His squadron was still in the harbor of Santiago de Cuba when an American squadron arrived on 27 May 1898 and began a blockade which would drag on for 37 days.

Some action occurred during the blockade. On 3 June 1898, the U.S. Navy steamed the collier  into the entrance channel to the harbor, hoping to scuttle her so as to block the channel and trap the Spanish ships inside. Spanish shore batteries already had disabled Merrimac when she drifted up the channel to a point where the Spanish ships could fire on her as well. Vizcaya, the unprotected cruiser , and the destroyer  all opened fire, and Merrimac quickly sank in a position that did not block the entrance. Vizcaya hit the bridge of Merrimac with several 5.5-inch rounds.

The blockade wore on, with Vizcaya and the others enduring occasional American naval bombardments of the harbor. Vizcaya still had two 5.5-inch guns out of commission, 80 percent of the 5.5-inch ammunition was defective, and nothing could be done under the circumstances about her terribly fouled bottom. Some of her men joined others from the fleet in a Naval Brigade to fight against a U.S. Army overland drive toward Santiago de Cuba.

By the beginning of July 1898, that drive threatened to capture Santiago de Cuba, and Cervera decided that his squadron's only hope was to try to escape into the open sea by running the blockade. The decision was made on 1 July 1898, with the break-out set for 3 July 1898.  The crew of Vizcaya spent 2 July 1898 returning from Naval Brigade service and preparing for action. Vizcaya was to be the second ship in line during the escape, following Cervera's flagship Infanta Maria Teresa; while Infanta Maria Teresa was sacrificed by attacking the fastest American ship, the armored cruiser , Vizcaya and the others were to put on all the speed they could and run westward for the open sea.

At about 0845 hours on 3 July 1898, the Spanish ships got underway. The U.S. squadron sighted the Spanish ships in the channel at about 0935, and the Battle of Santiago de Cuba began.

While their squadron mates turned to starboard and put on steam for a run to the west behind them, Vizcaya followed Infanta Maria Teresa closely as she charged Brooklyn as if to ram. When Brooklyn turned away to the east, Vizcaya and Infanta Maria Teresa turned west, brushing past the last obstacle in their path, the armed yacht .

Vizcaya now found herself back in the line-ahead formation the squadron had formed when it left its anchorage, in second place behind Infanta Maria Teresa and ahead of armored cruiser  and Almirante Oquendo.  At 1035, the sinking Infanta Maria Teresa was driven ashore with heavy damage and fires, and Almirante Oquendo soon suffered the same fate, running aground nearly abreast of Vizcaya. Further inshore, the two Spanish destroyers also succumbed. By 1050, Vizcaya and Cristóbal Colón were the only Spanish ships left.

Vizcaya managed to score two 5.5-inch hits on Brooklyn, killing the lone American sailor who died in the battle. But at about 1100, Brooklyn scored two 8-inch hits on Vizcaya; one detonated a torpedo in her forward tube and blew a large part of her bow off, and the other knocked down her bridge and set her decorative woodwork and wooden furnishings on fire. When the fire began to cause ready ammunition for the secondary battery to explode, the end was clearly at hand for Vizcaya. At 1106, she turned toward the shore, struck her battle ensign, and ran herself up on the beach.

Some of her sailors made it ashore, although they had to beware of Cuban insurgents, who began to shoot the survivors of the wrecked Spanish ships. Others were rescued by American sailors who brought small boats alongside the wrecks to take off survivors. One of those rescued was the commanding officer of Vizcaya, Captain Don Antonio Eulate, who, when brought aboard Iowa, looked at the burning wreck of his ship, raised his hand in salute, and called out "Adios, Vizcaya!" Immediately, as if on cue, the cruiser's forward magazines exploded.

Postwar, a U.S. Navy survey team evaluating Spanish wrecks for their potential for being raised and put in American service concluded that Vizcaya was beyond salvage.

At present, the Naval Battle Underwater Park of Santiago de Cuba has been created to preserve the wrecks of the ships and pay tribute to the brave sailors who perished in the place.  Aquatic immersions can be made.

Commemoration
Two of Vizcayas 140-mm (5.5-inch) naval guns were salvaged from her wreck and is on permanent display at the United States Naval Academy in Annapolis, Maryland.

Another of Vizcayas 140-mm guns is in Grant Park in Galena, Illinois, and one is at Historic Fort Wayne in Detroit Michigan.

Video gallery

Notes

References
 Chesneau, Roger, and Eugene M. Kolesnik, Eds. Conway's All The World's Fighting Ships 1860–1905. New York, New York: Mayflower Books Inc., 1979. .
 Nofi, Albert A. The Spanish–American War, 1898. Conshohocken, Pennsylvania: Combined Books, Inc., 1996. .

External links

 The Spanish–American War Centennial Website: Vizcaya
 The Spanish–American War Centennial Website: Almirante Oquendo 
 Department of the Navy: Naval Historical Center: Online Library of Selected Images: Spanish Navy Ships: Vizcaya (Armored Cruiser, 1891–1898) 
 Library of Congress film "Vizcaya Under Full Headway" on YouTube
 Library of Congress film "Wreck of the Vizcaya" on YouTube

Infanta Maria Teresa-class armored cruisers
Ships built in Spain
1891 ships
Spanish–American War cruisers of Spain
Shipwrecks in the Caribbean Sea
Shipwrecks of the Spanish–American War
Articles containing video clips
Naval magazine explosions